Marilyn Monroe (June 1, 1926 – August 4, 1962) was an American actress who appeared in 29 films between 1946 and 1961. After a brief career in modeling she signed short-term film contracts, first with 20th Century Fox, then Columbia Pictures, and appeared in minor roles for the first few years of her career. In 1950, she made minor appearances in two critically acclaimed films, The Asphalt Jungle and All About Eve. The parts in the two films were against many of the roles into which she was typecast, that of the dumb blonde. Margot A. Henriksen, her biographer with the American National Biography, considers the typecast "an unfair stereotype that bothered her throughout her career".

Her major breakthrough came in 1953, when she starred in three pictures: the film noir Niagara, and the comedies Gentlemen Prefer Blondes and How to Marry a Millionaire. Sarah Churchwell, Monroe's biographer, notes that "unconscious, rather than conscious, sexuality would become the Marilyn hallmark after 1953", and the actress became one of the most popular and recognizable people in America. In 1955 Monroe appeared in the Billy Wilder–directed comedy The Seven Year Itch, in which she becomes the object of her married neighbor's sexual fantasies. In it, Monroe stands on a subway grate with the air blowing up the skirt of her white dress; it became the most famous scene of her career.

After appearing in Bus Stop (1956), Monroe founded her own production company, Marilyn Monroe Productions, in 1955; the company produced one film independently, The Prince and the Showgirl (1957). Monroe then appeared in Some Like It Hot (1959) and The Misfits (1961). She was suspended from the filming of Something's Got to Give in June 1962, and the film remained uncompleted when she died in August. Although she was a top-billed actress for only a decade, her films grossed $200 million by the time of her unexpected death in 1962.

Monroe won, or was nominated for, several awards during her career. Those she won included the Henrietta Award for Best Young Box Office Personality (1951) and World Film Favorite (1953), and a Crystal Star Award and David di Donatello Award for The Prince and the Showgirl (1958). She was inducted to the Hollywood Walk of Fame in 1960, and a Golden Palm Star was dedicated at the Palm Springs Walk of Stars in 1995. In the 1999 American Film Institute's list of AFI's 100 Years...100 Stars, she was ranked as the sixth greatest film actress; three of the films in which she appeared—Some Like It Hot, All About Eve, and The Asphalt Jungle—have been added to the Library of Congress's National Film Registry, and the former earned her a Golden Globe for Best Actress. She continues to be considered a major icon in American popular culture in the decades following her death.

Filmography

Monroe completed 29 films in her career. In 1962, she was filming her thirtieth film, Something's Got to Give, when she was fired by the studio; she died before it was completed with others in the role.

Television

Awards and nominations

Notes and references

Notes

References

Sources

External links
 Marilyn Monroe filmography at the Internet Movie Database

Monroe, Marilyn
Monroe, Marilyn
Performances and awards
Monroe, Marilyn